Probasco may refer to:

People
Frank Probasco Bohn (1866–1944), politician from the U.S. state of Michigan
Gaylord Probasco Harnwell CBE (1903–1982), American educator, physicist, president of the University of Pennsylvania
Henry Probasco (1820–1902), American businessman
Scotty Probasco (1928–2015), American businessman and philanthropist

Locations
Henry Probasco House, historic house in Ohio, USA
Probasco Fountain, historic fountain in Ohio, USA
Probasco-Dittner Farmstead, historic farm in New Jersey, USA

See also
Basco (disambiguation)